Yommarat is a historical Thai noble title, of which many holders were fully titled Chaophraya Yommarat.

The terms may also refer to:

Yommarat Railway Halt in Bangkok
Chao Phraya Yommarat Hospital in Suphan Buri
Chao Phraya Yommarat (Pan Sukhum), the last holder of the title, after whom the hospital is named